Papunáua River is a river of Colombia. It is part of the Orinoco River basin. This is listed in the List of rivers in Vaupés Department

See also
List of rivers of Colombia

References
Rand McNally, The New International Atlas, 1993.

Rivers of Colombia
Categoría:Ríos del departamento de Vaupés (Colombia)

{{Vaupés Department-river-stub}}